James Vito Barbieri II (commonly known as Vito Barbieri) (born October 22, 1951) is an American politician and lawyer from Idaho. He is a Republican Idaho State Representative since 2010 representing District 2 in the A seat.

Early life, education, and career
Barbieri earned his associate degree from El Camino College and his bachelor's degree and J.D. from Western State College of Law.

He practiced law in California for 20 years. Since moving to Idaho in 2004, he has operated several small businessess, including a catering business and owns an electronic cigarette store in Post Falls.

Idaho House of Representatives

Committee assignments
Business Committee (chairman)
Local Government Committee
State Affairs Committee
Barbieri previously served on the Revenue and Taxation Committee from 2010 to 2012.

Elections

On November 23, 2020, Barbieri announce that he will run for Idaho House of Representatives assistant majority leader against Jason Monks.

Controversies
Barbieri came to national attention on February 23, 2015, after asking a doctor giving testimony if a woman could swallow a camera in order to undergo a remote gynecological exam and received the answer that such was not possible as swallowing a pill will not lead it to the vagina.  In response to commentary on social media about the seeming anatomical confusion, he explained his remarks:  "I was being rhetorical, because I was trying to make the point that equalizing a colonoscopy to this particular procedure was apples and oranges... So I was asking a rhetorical question that was designed to make her say that they weren't the same thing, and she did so. It was the response I wanted."

References

External links
 Vito Barbieri at the Idaho Legislature

1951 births
Living people
Idaho lawyers
Republican Party members of the Idaho House of Representatives
People from Kootenai County, Idaho
Politicians from San Antonio
Western State University College of Law alumni
21st-century American politicians